Miloš Bočić (born 26 January 2000) is a Serbian footballer who plays as a forward for Italian  club Frosinone on loan from Pescara.

Club career
He is a product of youth teams of Udinese and appeared on the bench on several occasions in the spring of 2019 for 2018–19 Serie A games, but did not see any time on the field.

On 31 August 2019, he signed with Serie B club Pescara.

He made his Serie B debut for Pescara on 22 December 2019 in a game against Trapani. He substituted Ledian Memushaj in the 89th minute. On 3 February 2020, he scored his first professional goal, an added-time winner in a 2–1 victory over Cosenza. On 14 February 2020, he appeared in the starting line-up for the first time, in a game against Cittadella.

On 21 January 2021, he joined Serie C club Pro Sesto on loan.

On 31 January 2022 Bočić was loaned to Pistoiese.

On 5 August 2022, he moved to Frosinone on loan with an option to buy.

References

External links
 
 

2000 births
Living people
Footballers from Belgrade
Serbian footballers
Association football forwards
Serie B players
Serie C players
Udinese Calcio players
Delfino Pescara 1936 players
S.S.D. Pro Sesto players
U.S. Pistoiese 1921 players
Frosinone Calcio players
Serbian expatriate footballers
Serbian expatriate sportspeople in Italy
Expatriate footballers in Italy